This is a list of outlaw wrestling promotions in the United States, sorted by regional area, from the 1940s to 1980s. This list does not include pre-1948 groups active during the "Pioneer Era" (1900s-1940s) or modern-day "indy promotions". Outlaw promotions are traditionally defined as professional wrestling promotions not affiliated with the National Wrestling Alliance, not recognizing the NWA World Heavyweight Championship and promoting shows in direct competition against NWA regional territories. Wrestlers who had been blackballed from the sport or were winding down their career often found a home with such promotions. These groups were often short-lived as NWA promoters would receive top stars from other members to prevent a potential takeover of a territory. This was not always the case, however, as some promotions freely cooperated with the NWA promoters (e.g. National Wrestling Federation) while others operated in areas where there was not an established NWA presence. Longtime NWA members, such as Jim Crockett Promotions, the Universal Wrestling Federation and World Class Championship Wrestling, left the organization in order to compete with the World Wrestling Federation during the 1980s wrestling boom.

New England

East Coast

Maryland

New Jersey

New York

Pennsylvania

Midwest

Illinois

Indiana

Iowa

Michigan

Minnesota

Missouri

Ohio

Wisconsin

Rocky Mountains

Southeast

Alabama

Florida

Georgia

Kentucky

Mississippi

North Carolina

South Carolina

Tennessee

Virginia

West Virginia

Southwest

Arizona

Oklahoma

Texas

West Coast

References
General

Specific

External links
 
 

Professional wrestling-related lists